College & Research Libraries News is a professional magazine that covers trends and practices affecting academic and research libraries and serves as the official news magazine and publication of record of the Association of College and Research Libraries. It was established in 1966 and is published 11 times a year. It is sometimes confused with another publication of the association, College & Research Libraries.

References

External links
 

Monthly magazines published in the United States
English-language magazines
Library science magazines
Magazines established in 1966
Magazines published in Chicago
1966 establishments in Illinois